Le Faouët can refer to two French communes in Brittany:

 Le Faouët, Morbihan in Morbihan
 Le Faouët, Côtes-d'Armor in Côtes-d'Armor

Note also Le Faou in Finistère.